Svjetlan Junaković (born 23 January 1961) is a Croatian painter, sculptor and illustrator, known best for his children's picture books. He has received numerous international awards for his illustrations and has participated in exhibitions throughout Europe.
For his lasting contribution as a children's illustrator, Junaković was a finalist for the biennial, international Hans Christian Andersen Award in both 2008 and 2010.

Biography

Junaković was born in Zagreb in 1961. He graduated from the Brera Academy in Milan in 1985 where he specialized in sculpture. He works as a painter, sculptor, illustrator and graphic designer and is also a lecturer in illustration at the Academy of Fine Arts in Zagreb and the International School in Sarmede in Italy.

Junaković has won many international prizes. In 2001 he won prizes at the Biennial of Illustration Bratislava for Mit Pauken und Trompeten (With Bass Drums and Trumpets) and Roter Frosch, grüner Flamingo (Red Frog, Greener Flamingo). In 2009 he won the Levstik Award for his illustrations in 100 + 1 uganka (100 + 1 Riddles).

Selected books as illustrator

 Roter Frosch, grüner Flamingo (Red Frog, Greener Flamingo), 1999
 Zirkus! Zirkus! (Circus! Circus!), 2002
 Kroko Kanal (Croc Canal), 2003
 Moj put (My Journey), 2007
 Velika knjiga portreta (The Great Portrait Book), 2007
 100 + 1 uganka (100 + 1 Riddles), 2008

References

External links
 
 

1961 births
Living people
Croatian children's book illustrators
Artists from Zagreb
Croatian illustrators
Levstik Award laureates